Mario Alejandro Borghese is an Italian politician. He is currently serving as a Senator of the Italian Republic after previously serving in the Chamber of Deputies. He represents Italians abroad in South America.

Notes

References 

Living people
21st-century Italian politicians
1981 births